In actuarial science and applied probability, ruin theory (sometimes risk theory or collective risk theory) uses mathematical models to describe an insurer's vulnerability to insolvency/ruin. In such models key quantities of interest are the probability of ruin, distribution of surplus immediately prior to ruin and deficit at time of ruin.

Classical model

The theoretical foundation of ruin theory, known as the Cramér–Lundberg model (or classical compound-Poisson risk model, classical risk process or Poisson risk process) was introduced in 1903 by the Swedish actuary Filip Lundberg. Lundberg's work was republished in the 1930s by Harald Cramér.

The model describes an insurance company who experiences two opposing cash flows: incoming cash premiums and outgoing claims. Premiums arrive a constant rate c > 0 from customers and claims arrive according to a Poisson process  with intensity λ and are independent and identically distributed non-negative random variables  with distribution F and mean μ (they form a compound Poisson process). So for an insurer who starts with initial surplus x, the aggregate assets  are given by:

The central object of the model is to investigate the probability that the insurer's surplus level eventually falls below zero (making the firm bankrupt). This quantity, called the probability of ultimate ruin, is defined as

This can be computed exactly using the Pollaczek–Khinchine formula as (the ruin function here is equivalent to the tail function of the stationary distribution of waiting time in an M/G/1 queue)

and  denotes the -fold convolution.
In the case where the claim sizes are exponentially distributed, this simplifies to

Sparre Andersen model
E. Sparre Andersen extended the classical model in 1957 by allowing claim inter-arrival times to have arbitrary distribution functions.

The model is also known as the renewal risk model.

Expected discounted penalty function

Michael R. Powers and Gerber and Shiu analyzed the behavior of the insurer's surplus through the expected discounted penalty function, which is commonly referred to as Gerber-Shiu function in the ruin literature and named after actuarial scientists Elias S.W. Shiu and Hans-Ulrich Gerber. It is arguable whether the function should have been called Powers-Gerber-Shiu function due to the contribution of Powers.

In Powers' notation, this is defined as

,

where  is the discounting force of interest,  is a general penalty function reflecting the economic costs to the insurer at the time of ruin, and the expectation  corresponds to the probability measure .  The function is called expected discounted cost of insolvency by Powers.

In Gerber and Shiu's notation, it is given as

,

Here the indicator function  emphasizes that the penalty is exercised only when ruin occurs.

It is quite intuitive to interpret the expected discounted penalty function. While Gerber and Shiu applied this function to the classical compound-Poisson model, Powers argued that an insurer's surplus is better modeled by a family of diffusion processes.

There are a great variety of ruin-related quantities that fall into the category of the expected discounted penalty function.

Other finance-related quantities belonging to the class of the expected discounted penalty function include the perpetual American put option, the contingent claim at optimal exercise time, and more.

Recent developments

Compound-Poisson risk model with constant interest
Compound-Poisson risk model with stochastic interest
Brownian-motion risk model
General diffusion-process model
Markov-modulated risk model
Accident probability factor (APF) calculator – risk analysis model (@SBH)

See also
Financial risk
Volterra integral equation#Ruin theory

References

Further reading

Actuarial science
Stochastic processes
Mathematical finance
Risk